Isotopes Punk Rock Baseball Club or commonly, The Isotopes, are a Canadian punk rock band, based in Vancouver. All of the band's songs pertain to the subject of baseball or baseball-related topics. They've released a few 7-inch EPs through Red Scare Records and have self-professed themselves The "World's Greatest Baseball Punk Band". January 2015, the band announced signing to Stomp Records and release of their debut album "Nuclear Strikezone". On April 14, 2017, the band is set to release their 2nd studio album "1994 World Series Champion" via Stomp/Destiny Records in North America and UK/Europe respectively.

In 2018, they were featured in the music documentary Baseball Punx.

Discography

Studio albums
 Nuclear Strikezone (2015)
 1994 World Series Champions (2017)

Extended plays
Heatseeker (2009)
Cuban Missile (2011)
Blood Diamond (2012)

Singles
"Lead Off" (2007) 
"The Ballad of Rey Ordonez" (2011)
 Total Juicehead (2015)
 The Invisible Hand Of The M.L.B. Is Meddling (2020)

Compilations
"The First Four Seasons" (2013)

References

Canadian punk rock groups
Baseball music